Um Reifenbreite is a bicycle racing themed board game for two to four players. It was invented by Rob Bontenbal.

Awards
Spiel des Jahres Game of the Year 1992
Deutscher Spiele Preis 1992 2nd place

Reviews
Strategy Plus

References

External links

Um Reifenbreite at Cyclingboardgames.net
Rules of Um Reifenbreite at GameCabinet.com
Review by Tom Vasel (Dice Tower)

Jumbo Games games
Spiel des Jahres winners